"A Little Boogie Woogie in the Back of My Mind" is a song by English glam rock singer Gary Glitter, released in June 1977 as a single from his album Silver Star. Glitter declared himself bankrupt in 1977 after this single and "It Takes All Night Long", both Top 40 hits, failed to improve his financial situation.

Charts

Shakin' Stevens version 

In 1987, Welsh singer Shakin' Stevens covered the song for his album Let's Boogie. It was more successful than the original, peaking at number 12 on the UK Singles Chart.

Track listings 
7": Epic / SHAKY 3 (UK)

 "A Little Boogie Woogie (In the Back of My Mind)" – 3:30
 "If You're Gonna Cry" – 3:43

12": Epic / SHAKY T3 (UK)

 "A Little Boogie Woogie (In the Back of My Mind)" (Boogie Mix) – 8:40
 "A Little Boogie Woogie (In the Back of My Mind)" (7" Version) – 3:30
 "If You're Gonna Cry" – 3:43

Charts

References 

1977 singles
1977 songs
1987 singles
1987 songs
Gary Glitter songs
Shakin' Stevens songs
Songs written by Gary Glitter
Songs written by Mike Leander
Arista Records singles
Epic Records singles
Songs written by Eddie Seago